Metaterpna thyatiraria is a moth of the family Geometridae first described by Charles Oberthür in 1913. It is found in the Chinese provinces of Gansu, Yunnan, Sichuan and Shaanxi.

References

Moths described in 1913
Pseudoterpnini